The qualification process for the 2003 Rugby World Cup began during the pool stages of the 1999 tournament in Wales, during which the quarterfinalists were awarded automatic qualification for the 2003 event. A further twelve teams qualified through regional tournaments and the repechage process.

Qualifiers

Qualifiers
A total of 79 teams from around the world were involved in some stage of qualifying.

Repechage qualification

 Repechage 1 
 Repechage 2

Africa qualification 
In qualification for the 2003 Rugby World Cup, there was one position for an African nation, as well as the possibility of repechage qualification. Namibia qualified, joining automatic qualifiers South Africa at the competition in Australia.

Pool A 

|- bgcolor="C0FFC0"
|
|2||1||0||1||+16||4
|- 
|
|2||1||0||1||-8||4
|-
|  
|2||1||0||1||-8||4
|}

Match schedule

Pool B 

|- bgcolor="C0FFC0"
|
|2||2||0||0||+25||6
|- 
|
|2||1||0||1||-10||4
|-
|  
|2||0||0||2||-15||2
|}

Match schedule

Round 2

Final standings 

|- bgcolor="C0FFC0"
|
|2||2||0||0||+13||6
|- 
|
|2||1||0||1||+18||4
|-
|  
|2||0||0||2||-31||2
|}

Match Schedule

Round 3

Pool A 

|- bgcolor="C0FFC0"
|
|2||2||0||0||+6||6
|- 
|
|2||1||0||1||+1||4
|-
|  
|2||0||0||2||-7||2
|}

Match schedule

Pool B 

|- bgcolor="C0FFC0"
|
|2||2||0||0||+124||6
|- 
|
|2||1||0||1||+37||4
|-
|  
|2||0||0||2||-161||2
|}

Match schedule

Round 4 
Namibia won the round based on total tries scored (4 to 3).  Namibia qualified to Pool A of the 2003 Rugby World Cup as Africa 1. Tunisia advanced to Repechage.

Americas qualification 
In qualification for the 2003 Rugby World Cup, a number of positions were available to Americas nations. Canada, Uruguay and the USA would eventually qualify.

Round 1 (North) 
Winner (Trinidad and Tobago) qualified to Round 2.

Round 1 (South) 
Valid also as 2001 South American Rugby Championship "B"

Winner (Brazil) qualified to Round 2.

Final standings

Match Schedule

Round 2 
Winner (Brazil) qualified to Round 3.

Round 3

Match schedule

Round 4 
Top two (Canada and Uruguay) qualified to World Cup as Americas 1 and 2.  3rd Place (USA) to Repechage.

Final standings

Match Schedule

Asia 
In qualification for the 2003 Rugby World Cup, there was one position available to the Asia qualifiers, as well as the possibility of further repechage qualification. Japan would go on to qualify for the competition.

Round 1 – April 2002

Pool A 

|- bgcolor="C0FFC0"
|
|1||1||0||0||+54||3
|- 
|
|1||1||0||0||+29||3
|-
|  
|2||0||0||2||-83||2
|}

Match schedule

Pool B 

|- bgcolor="C0FFC0"
|
|2||2||0||0||+17||6
|- 
|
|2||1||0||1||+10||4
|-
|  
|2||0||0||2||-27||2
|}

Match schedule

Pool C 

|- bgcolor="C0FFC0"
|
|2||1||0||1||+40||4
|- 
|
|2||1||0||1||-4||4
|-
|  
|2||1||0||1||-36||4
|}

Match schedule

Round 2 – May, 2002 

|- bgcolor="C0FFC0"
|
|2||2||0||0||+13||6
|- 
|
|2||1||0||1||+22||4
|-
|  
|2||0||0||2||-35||2
|}

Match schedule

Round 3 – June–July, 2002 
Winner (Japan) qualified to Pool B of 2003 Rugby World Cup as Asia 1. Runner-up (Korea) advanced to Repechage.
|- bgcolor="C0FFC0"
|
|4||4||0||0||+373||12
|- bgcolor="D8FFD8" 
|
|4||2||0||2||+31||8
|-
|  
|4||0||0||4||-404||4
|}

Match schedule

References